Shri Ramswaroop Memorial Public School (SRMPS) is a private day boarding school for girls and boys in Lucknow, Uttar Pradesh,India. It was established in July 2005. They educate students from class-I to class-XII. The population of Class I to Class V is 25 students and the population of Class VI to XII is 40 students.

SRMPS is a residential and day boarding school affiliated to the Central Board of Secondary Education (CBSE) with excellent Academic and Sports facilities.
The school has air-conditioned classrooms, labs and dining facility with separate hostels for boys and girl. Students are taken care of by the Wardens and House Parents who closely monitor students activities before and after school.

SRMPS has  "Smart Classroom" with white boards and overhead projectors. They promote co-curricular activities in the form of music, dance, theatre, art, craft, sports & yoga. SRMPS has an 18 meter long swimming pool.

SRMPS has three dining halls which can together accommodate about 450 students at a time. Students get nutritious and vegetarian food.

Programmes of study & subjects available 
The school is affiliated to the Central Board of Secondary Education, New Delhi. School has Classes
from I to XII. The subjects taught up to Class X are English, Hindi, Math, Science, Social Studies and Fundamentals of IT. After Class X, students can take up any of the 3 streams available:

ARTS – 
i) English
ii) History
iii) Political Science
iv) Economics

SCIENCE -
i) English
ii) Physics
iii) Chemistry
iv) Biology/ Mathematics

COMMERCE -
i) English
ii) Accounts
iii)  Business Studies
iv) Economics

Canteen
Food is available in the canteen for resident scholars on payment. Cash is not accepted in the canteen. Students have their canteen cards which can be used for buying food. The cost of these items is debited to the Imprest Account of the student.

Sports & Games
Each boy or girl has to choose a sport in which they receive training in the evening. Attendance is taken by the wardens before handing over the students to their respective coaches. The coaches offers training at various levels for different categories of players.
The Sports & Games School has in the evening are: Football, Cricket, Badminton,
Volley Ball, Basket Ball, Kho Kho, Swimming, Judo and Athletics. Carrom &
Chess are among the Board Games that are played at the Inter House levels.

Birthdays

Students are allowed to celebrate their birthdays in the Boarding House. Parents must ensure there is sufficient money in the child's birthday account. Eatables can be procured on request for these Birthday Parties from the Birthday Account. All celebrations will take place in the dining hall only, after getting the requisite recommendation from the House Parent and written permission from the Hostel Superintendent. Parents are requested not to bring eatables from outside for these celebrations as it is not possible for us to ascertain the quality of these items.

Movies

Resident scholars are permitted movie outings once a month. The whole Boarding House goes to a multiplex and gets to watch the latest of movies that are released. Snacks and drinks are provided in the auditorium. The cost is debited to the Imprest Account. In addition to these, movie shows are held in the school auditorium from time to time in which old English classics and educational videos are shown.

Swimming Pool

In the Swimming Season, Boys and Girls will be allowed to use the pool separately. Students should turn up in proper swimming costumes. No one allowed to enter the pool unless there is a life guard or a coach. Eating and drinking cold drinks in the pool area is strictly prohibited. Students are advised to have a shower before entering the pool.

Cameras

All dormitories and common rooms have CCTV cameras to record unusual activities and movements.
Students are expected not to tamper the angles of these cameras.
'SRMPS academic year runs from April to March. Candidates may submit application form either ONLINE or can download the application form from the website of SRMPS'.

Image gallery

References

High schools and secondary schools in Uttar Pradesh
Schools in Lucknow
Private schools in Uttar Pradesh
Private schools in Lucknow
Boys' schools in India